Carlos A. Cooks was a politician from Dominican Republic.

Overview 

Carlos A. Cooks was born in San Pedro de Macoris Dominican Republic on June 23, 1913 to James Henry Cooks and Alice Cooks, who were originally from the neighboring island of St. Martin. His education took place mostly in Santo Domingo until moving to New York in 1929 where he went on to higher learning. Cooks was known for his love of sports and his expertise in boxing.  His intellect was recognized from an early age and he attended the leadership school in the Voodoo Sacré Society. Cooks' involvement in the UNIA comes as no surprise as both his uncle and father were among the many St. Martiners who were members of the Marcus Garvey-led organization. He was a key link in the history of Black American nationalism between Marcus Garvey before him and Malcolm X, whom he influenced. Carlos Cooks administered the Advance Division of the UNIA after Marcus Garvey was deported.  He founded the African Nationalist Pioneer Movement.

He died in Harlem, New York, on May 5, 1966. He died at age 53.

Cooks and Garvey 

Marcus Garvey was an influence on Cooks, who was taken to meetings of the Garvey Movements as a child by his father and uncle. He then went on join the Garvey Union and its Universal African Legion. It is said that at age nineteen Cooks was knighted by Garvey, becoming a member of the movement.

Cooks argued that all Garvey's actions were devoted towards the upliftment and improvement of the status of Black People in the United States of America. Unlike Garvey, Cooks was skeptical of W. E. B. Du Bois, whom he regarded as a white hireling of the NAACP. In his work, entitled Marcus Garvey Champion of African Redemption, Cooks describes Du Bois as an opponent of Garveyism, and as attacking and ridiculing the movement through his magazine Crisis.

The African Nationalist Pioneer Movement 
Born out of Garvey's Universal Negro Improvement Association and African Communities League, the African Nationalist Pioneer Movement was started by Carlos Cooks on June 23, 1941. He envisioned that movement as "an educational, inspirational, instructive, constructive and expansive society... composed of people desirous of bringing about a progressive, dignified, cultural, fraternal and racial confraternity among the African peoples of the world."

Lectures and works 
Some of his most famous works include:
 Why Black nationalism
 Fundamentalism: A Call to Action
 The Nationalist Manifesto
 Racial Integration—A Sociological Farce
 The Tragic Consequences of White Psychology
 American Tradition Vetoes Integration
 Strange, Isn't It?
 Harlem—Citadel of the Caste
 Marcus Garvey Champion of African Redemption
 Lumumba foils Colonialist Plot to Partition the Congo
 Kwame Nkrumah of Ghana
 Jomo Kenyatta, Man of Africa

Cooks also gave public lectures of Africanism between 1945 and 1966. Some of his most famous ones include: 
 Passing the Baton Garvey to Cooks (June to December 1954)
 Hair Conking; Buy Black (May–December 1955)
 Gamal Abdel Nasser; Marcus Garvey Day (May–December 1955)
 Ras and the Caste (January–December 1956)
 Ethiopia; Haiti; Liberia; Kenya; the Black Woman (January–December 1966)
 Native Africans; Civil Rights (April 3, 1966)
 Religion (April 8, 1966)
 Lucifer, God and Civil Rights (April 10, 1966)
 The Caste Woman (April 15, 1966)
 Organization ( April 15, 1966)
 Yankee-Doodleism vs. Nationalism 
 Jews, Crackers and the Caste ( April 24, 1966)

References

External links
 Carlos A. Cooks, "The Ideological Son of Marcus Mosiah Garvey."(archive), BN Village
 Carlos Cooks and Black Nationalism from Garvey to Malcolm by Robert Harris (author), Nyota Harris (author), Grandassa Harris (editor)
 Carlos A. Cooks at Find A Grave 

African-American activists
Dominican Republic emigrants to the United States
American pan-Africanists
African and Black nationalists